House of the Blackheads may refer to:

 House of the Blackheads (Riga), building in Riga, Latvia
 House of the Blackheads (Tallinn), building in Tallinn, Estonia